Diphenylmethane is an organic compound with the formula (C6H5)2CH2 (often abbreviated ). The compound consists of methane wherein two hydrogen atoms are replaced by two phenyl groups. It is a white solid.

Diphenylmethane is a common skeleton in organic chemistry. The diphenylmethyl group is also known as benzhydryl.

Synthesis
It is prepared by the Friedel–Crafts alkylation of benzyl chloride with benzene in the presence of a Lewis acid such as aluminium chloride:
C6H5CH2Cl + C6H6 → (C6H5)2CH2 + HCl

Reactivity of the C-H bond
The methylene group in diphenylmethane is mildly acidic with a pKa of 32.2, and so can be deprotonated with sodium amide.

(C6H5)2CH2 + NH2− → (C6H5)2CH− + NH3

The resulting carbanion can be alkylated. For example, treatment with n-bromobutane produces 1,1-diphenylpentane in 92% yield.

(C6H5)2CH− + CH3CH2CH2CH2Br → (C6H5)2CHCH2CH2CH2CH3 + Br−

Alkylation of various benzhydryl compounds has been demonstrated using the corresponding alkyl halides, both primary (benzyl chloride, β-phenylethyl chloride, and n-octyl bromide) and secondary (benzhydryl chloride, α-phenylethyl chloride, and isopropyl chloride), in yields between 86 and 99%.

The acidity of the methylene group in diphenylmethane is due to the weakness of the (C6H5)2CH–H bond, which has a bond dissociation energy of 82 kcal mol−1 (340 kJ mol−1). This is well below the published bond dissociation energies for comparable C–H bonds in propane, where BDE((CH3)2CH–H)=98.6 kcal mol−1, and toluene, where BDE(C6H5CH2–H)=89.7 kcal mol−1.

See also
Benzhydryl compounds
Toluene, a.k.a. methylbenzene, phenylmethane
Triphenylmethane
Tetraphenylmethane

References

 
Benzyl compounds